Hassaram Rijhumal College of Commerce and Economics, commonly known as HR College, is an autonomous (since 2007) educational institute located in Churchgate, Mumbai. It is run by the Hyderabad (Sindh) National Collegiate Board and is affiliated to the HSNC University.

It was the second college in Maharashtra (after KC College, Churchgate) to be accredited ‘A’ grade with a score of 87.95% by the NAAC (National Assessment & Accreditation Council) under the revised scheme in 2002.

It is located adjacent to Kishinchand Chellaram College and shares a building with the KC Law College.

College Leadership
Dr. Indu Shahani, a noted academic and former Sheriff of Mumbai, is a former principal of HR College.

Currently, Dr. Pooja Ramchandani the principal in charge of the college.

Courses
The courses offered by the institute can be broadly classified into two categories; Junior college degrees & Senior college degrees.

Junior college degrees includes 11th grade (FYJC) & 12th grade (SYJC) courses. For this, it is affiliated to Maharashtra State education board. This includes the High School passing certificate (Class 12 certificate).

Senior college degrees offered by the institute include courses such as B.COM, BMS, BAF , BBI , BFM , BAMMC, and BVoc(Retail Management) , BVoc(Wealth Management) and BVoc(Tourism and Hospitality Management). For this, it is affiliated to the HSNC University.

HSNC University
In 2019, it was announced that HR College will be part of the second cluster university in Mumbai called HSNC Cluster University. This cluster university would also include (and be led by) KC College. They were officially supposed to become part of the cluster university from academic year 2020-21.

Notable alumni

Sooraj Barjatya, film director
Arjun Bijlani, Indian actor
Shantanu Maheshwari
Rajeev Masand, Indian Film Critic
Kumar Mangalam Birla, Business Leader (Chairman, Aditya Birla Group)
Kishore Biyani, businessman
Aarti Chhabria, actress
Varun Dhawan, actor
Tanaaz Irani, actress
Karan Johar, Noted film director
Karan Jotwani, model & actor
Kunal Jaisingh, actor
Ranbir Kapoor, actor
Punit Malhotra, filmmaker
Neil Nitin Mukesh, Noted actor
Mishal Raheja, actor & entrepreneur
Darsheel Safary, actor
Suniel Shetty, Notable actor
Aftab Shivdasani, actor
Ranveer Singh, actor
Amyra Dastur, actress
Sunil Lulla, CEO of BARC India & Former Group CEO of Balaji Telefilms
Ashish Pherwani, M&E Leader, Ernst & Young India
Indu Shahani, Academician & President, Atlas Skilltech University
Parag Ajagaonkar, Principal of Narsee Monjee College
Tarun Katial, CEO of Zee5 & Founder of Big FM
Vikram Limaye, MD & CEO of the National Stock Exchange
Navjot Singh Sidhu, politician & former cricketer
Avani Davda, MD of Godrej Nature's Basket 
Sajid Nadiadwala, Film producer
Namit Malhotra, CEO of DNEG 
Devita Saraf, Founder & CEO of VU Technologies
Sobhita Dhulipala, model and actress
Farhan Akhtar, Film director, actor, singer, writer & producer
Anant Bajaj, Ex-MD of Bajaj Electricals 
Piyush Goyal, Politician & Union Cabinet Minister (Railways, Commerce, etc.)
Gautam Singhania, Business Leader (Chairman & MD, Raymonds Textiles)
Deena Mehta, Ex-President, Bombay Stock Exchange

References

External links
 

Universities and colleges in Mumbai
Commerce colleges in India
Colleges in India

See also
Kishinchand Chellaram College
Narsee Monjee College of Commerce and Economics
Mithibai College
St. Xavier's College, Mumbai
Sydenham College of Commerce and Economics
Jai Hind College